Liverpool, a port city in north-west England, was involved in the transatlantic slave trade. The trade developed in the eighteenth century, as Liverpool slave traders were able to supply fabric from Manchester to the Caribbean islands at very competitive prices.

History
On 1 December 1699 the successful tobacco and sugar merchant William Clayton, owner of the ship "Liverpool Merchant" sent his ship to Africa, where the captain William Webster bought a number of enslaved Africans, 220 were sold in Barbados. This is thought to be first known ship to sail from Liverpool to transport slaves to the new world. Another Liverpool vessel, the "Blessing", set sail in 1700. Over the next 30 years Liverpool grew rapidly. The growth in shipping out of Liverpool began to increase slowly over the next 30–40 years with ties to the American colonies firmly established by 1700, merchants were transporting sugar and tobacco from the colonies. Liverpool was transformed from "not much more than a fishing village" due to an extensive rise in the manufacturing of textiles, iron, and firearms and gunpowder. In the years of growth Liverpool goods were being exported from the Liverpool port with first commercial wet dock being built in 1715, and by 1730 there were 15 Liverpool slave ships headed toward Africa where the goods manufactured in Liverpool were exchanged for slaves.

From the mid 1740s Liverpool was the largest slave trading port in Britain, overtaking Bristol. By 1750 Liverpool was the pre-eminent slave trading port in Great Britain. Thereafter Liverpool's control of the industry continued to grow. In the period between 1793 and 1807, when the slave trade was abolished, Liverpool accounted for 84.7% of all slave voyages, with London accounting for 12% and Bristol 3.3%.

After 1780, the Liverpool slave trade reached its height, there was no shortage of docking facilities at the Port of Liverpool. The local government, the Liverpool Corporation, was unusual for its time because of its financial strength and it invested or £1 million in 6 new docks during the 18th century. Liverpool's docks were also used for ship building, they built 26 per cent of the total UK shipping involved in the slave trade, a total of 2,120 ships between 1701 and 1810. In comparison, the next two biggest slave ports, London and Bristol, combined, built less than half of the slave ships built in Liverpool.

Liverpool's growth as a slave trade port was caused by locational advantages, at time of war, Bristol and London ships would have to sail closer mainland Europe before making a crossing to North America and the West Indies, in contrast Liverpool ships could sail North of Ireland after leaving port. A second advantage was Liverpool's close association with the nearby Isle of Man. Until 1765 the island had tax free status, allowing Dutch East Indiamen vessels to warehouse goods that could then be picked up by Liverpool ships for onward travel into the Atlantic ocean without paying landing fees to the UK government. A third reason for Liverpool's ascendency in the slave trade was the cities close proximity to the industrialising North of England. Liverpool slave traders could readily source goods to be traded for enslaved people, the African slave traders in particular favoured trading in cotton goods, an industry that Lancashire became productive with.

Liverpool's slave traders bought captives across the whole of West Africa, however they specialised in the Bight of Biafra and West Central Africa. From 1740 to 1810 they took 427,000 people from the Bight of Biafra and 197,000 from West Central Africa.

Liverpool traders maintained a close relationship with African trading chiefs, and developed a network of African contacts. Liverpool also  specialised in their delivery areas, they sold 391,000 enslaved people to Jamaica alone between 1741 and 1810. and in the same period 85,000 enslaved people to Barbados. They were dominant in most slave markets except Chesapeake where Bristol remained the biggest importer.

African Company of Merchants
List of Liverpool members of the African Company of Merchants

The African Company Act 1750 set up the replacement of the Royal African Company with the African Company of Merchants. This act specified that the slave trade should be "free and open to all his Majesty's subjects". However it further stipulated that "all his Majesty's subjects, who shall trade to or from any of the ports or places of Africa, between Cape Blanco, and the Cape of Good Hope, shall for ever hereafter be a body corporate and politick, in name, and in deed, by the name of The Company of Merchants trading to Africa". The act then created an organisational outline for the African Company of Merchants based around the localities of London, Bristol and Liverpool. This stipulated how all merchants wishing to join should pay 40 shillings to an identified person in their city, with provision for the members of each city to elect three committee members to run the corporation. The town clerk of Liverpool was given responsibility in that city. On 24 June 1752, 101 merchants formally joined the company.

Street names
Many street names in Liverpool are named after slave traders. These include Bold Street, Earle Road, Tarlton Street, Cunliffe Street, Cropper Street. While Penny Lane, immortalised in the song "Penny Lane" by the Beatles, has often been linked with slave ship owner James Penny an investigation by the International Slavery Museum found “no historical evidence” to support a connection.

International Slavery Museum
The International Slavery Museum is based at Liverpool docks above the Merseyside Maritime Museum. The museum was founded on August 23, 2007, the bicentenary of the abolition of the slave trade.

References

Sources
 

1699 establishments
British slave trade
Black British history